The Kokomo Perspective was a weekly newspaper serving Kokomo, Indiana, established in August 1989, with almost exclusively local content. It ceased operating on November 29, 2021.

The Perspective was distributed for free to 31,000 homes every Wednesday and beat the local daily newspaper, the Kokomo Tribune in Monday through Saturday, and Sunday alone, circulation (although many copies were never read and immediately thrown away). The weekly paper tended to lean toward a union-friendly worldview, as Kokomo is a heavily unionized city, with FCA US and Delphi Automotive Systems being the largest employers. However, the paper carried columns from a wide range of viewpoints in the community, some of which were very conservative and at times hostile to the publication itself.

The paper also published public vitals each week, providing information about citizens' court happenings, arrests, mug shots, marriages, divorces, causes of death, and obituaries. The section was one of the most popular sections of the paper.

One of the publication's overriding goals was to foster public awareness of the political process and to mobilize the citizens of Howard County, of which Kokomo is the county seat, to participate in electing local officials.

In January 2017, local attorney Brian Oaks bought part ownership of The Kokomo Perspective with plans to fully purchase the business down the road. Don Wilson was the publisher for the next several years.
In March 2017, Brian Oaks also purchased the weekly Kokomo Herald.

In June 2017, the paper switched to being delivered via the United States Postal Service versus carriers to ensure reliable delivery every week. The paper size also was changed to the Berliner format, which is slightly narrower and shorter than the broadsheet format.

In addition to delivering 31,000 papers to homes in Kokomo, an additional 3,000 papers were dropped off at area businesses also free of charge.

The Perspective office was located in downtown Kokomo at 209 N. Main St.

References 

1989 establishments in Indiana
2021 disestablishments in Indiana
Defunct newspapers published in Indiana
Defunct weekly newspapers
Howard County, Indiana
Newspapers established in 1989
Publications disestablished in 2021
Weekly newspapers published in the United States